Teresita Manaloto-Magnaye is a Filipina short story writer. Her short stories saw print in the Liwayway magazine, the oldest magazine in the Philippines.

References

Living people
Filipino women short story writers
1939 births
Place of birth missing (living people)